The Noxubee River (NAHKS-uh-bee) is a tributary of the Tombigbee River, about  long, in east-central Mississippi and west-central Alabama in the United States. Via the Tombigbee, it is part of the watershed of the Mobile River, which flows to the Gulf of Mexico.

Course
The Noxubee rises in Choctaw Lake in the Tombigbee National Forest in Choctaw County, Mississippi, and flows generally southeastwardly through Winston, Oktibbeha and Noxubee Counties in Mississippi, and Sumter County in Alabama, through the Noxubee National Wildlife Refuge and past the town of Macon, Mississippi.  It joins the Tombigbee River from the west, about 2 mi (3 km) west of Gainesville, Alabama.

Name
Noxubee is a name derived from the Choctaw language meaning "to stink".

According to the Geographic Names Information System, the Noxubee River has also been known as:

Hachcha Osi River
Hatch Oose River
Hatcha River
Hatchaoose River
Hatche Oose River
Hatchoose River
Nooksabba River
Noxaby Creek
Noxiby River
Noxshubby River
Noxube River
Noxuby Creek
Oaknoxaby River
Oaknoxubee River
Ohanexubee River
Oka Noxubee
Oka Onoxubba River
Okanoxubee River
Okenoxubbee River
Okenoxubee River
Olamoyubee River
Ruisseau Nachebe Tchitou River

See also
List of Alabama rivers
List of Mississippi rivers

References

DeLorme (1998).  Alabama Atlas & Gazetteer.  Yarmouth, Maine: DeLorme.  .
DeLorme (1998).  Mississippi Atlas & Gazetteer.  Yarmouth, Maine: DeLorme.  .

External links
Noxubee National Wildlife Refuge website

Rivers of Alabama
Rivers of Mississippi
Bodies of water of Choctaw County, Mississippi
Bodies of water of Sumter County, Alabama
Bodies of water of Noxubee County, Mississippi
Bodies of water of Oktibbeha County, Mississippi
Bodies of water of Winston County, Mississippi
Tributaries of the Tombigbee River
Mississippi placenames of Native American origin
Alabama placenames of Native American origin